Mauro De Filippis (born 10 August 1980) is an Italian sport shooter.

He participated at the 2018 ISSF World Shooting Championships.

References

External links

Living people
1980 births
Italian male sport shooters
Trap and double trap shooters
Sportspeople from Taranto
Shooters at the 2020 Summer Olympics
20th-century Italian people
21st-century Italian people